Akvsent Guiorgadze (born 4 June 1976 in Kutaisi, Georgian SSR, Soviet Union) is a Georgian rugby union player. He plays as a hooker.

Guiorgadze played for Toulouse, in 2011/12, and now plays for Tournefeuille, in France. He is an international player for the Georgian national team. Guiorgadze made his debut for Georgia on 12 April 1996 in a match against . Guiorgadze has played 64 times for his country, scoring 12 tries.  Guiorgadze represented Georgia at the 2003, 2007 and 2011 World Cups. Akvsenti is the older brother of Irakli, fellow international rugby player.

References

Rugby union players from Georgia (country)
1976 births
Living people
Rugby union hookers
Expatriate rugby union players from Georgia (country)
Expatriate rugby union players in France
Expatriate rugby union players in Italy
Expatriate sportspeople from Georgia (country) in France
Expatriate sportspeople from Georgia (country) in Italy
Georgia international rugby union players